The Making of a Marchioness is a 1901 novel by Frances Hodgson Burnett, followed by a sequel, The Methods of Lady Walderhurst. Subsequent editions  published the two books together, either under the original name The Making of a Marchioness or as Emily Fox-Seton. The collected version was republished by Persephone Books in 2007, and it was then adapted for radio and television.

Plot summary 
Emily Fox-Seton is a woman of good birth but no money who had worked as a lady's companion and now assists various members of the upper class with day-to-day practical matters. As the novel opens, she is 34 years old, living in a small room in a lodging house in an unfashionable area of London. Her chief employer is Lady Maria Bayne, who is both very selfish and very funny, although she does come to care for Emily. In a Cinderella-like twist, Emily marries a man twenty years her senior, James, the Marquess of Walderhurst, thus becoming a marchioness. In the sequel, originally The Methods of Lady Walderhurst, Emily has Walderhurst's child, and his former heir, Alec Osborn, attempts to regain what he sees as his birthright.

Themes 
The Persephone Forum compares Emily Fox-Seton with the title character of Miss Pettigrew Lives for a Day. Both are well-born women with little money in an era when such women had few job opportunities.

The book also reflects the casual racism of its day. The Persephone Forum comments: "The language of 1900 may offend now, but that was how it was, and Mrs Cupp’s ill-judged present of a little brown Testament to Hester Osborn’s Indian maid is firmly mocked."

Publication history 
The Making of a Marchioness and The Methods of Lady Walderhurst were originally published in 1901, while Burnett was also working on a longer and more complicated novel, The Shuttle. Both books were republished in 2007 as The Making of a Marchioness by Persephone Books.

Adaptations 
In 2007, The Making of a Marchioness was made into a BBC Radio 4 Classic Serial, dramatised by Michelene Wandor, directed by Chris Wallis, and featuring Charles Dance as Lord Walderhurst, Miriam Margolyes as Lady Walderhurst, Lucy Briers as Emily, Joanna David as the narrator, Anjali Jay as Hester, and Amara Karan as Lady Agatha. The Radio Times called the radio adaptation a "delightful and occasionally dark romance."

In 2012, the television film The Making of a Lady was created based on the book. Kate Brooke wrote the screenplay adaptation, and Richard Curson Smith directed. Lydia Wilson starred as Emily, Linus Roache as Lord James Walderhurst, Joanna Lumley as Lady Maria Byrne, and James D’Arcy as Captain Alec Osborn.  The film premiered in 2012 on ITV in Britain, and was subsequently broadcast on PBS in the United States in 2014.

References

External links 
 Emily Fox-Seton at Project Gutenberg
 
 The Making of a Marchioness  Persephone Books
 BBC Radio 4 Classic Serials  The Making of a Marchioness 

1901 American novels
American novels adapted into films
British novels adapted into films
Novels by Frances Hodgson Burnett